Fatal Vows is an American documentary television series on Investigation Discovery that debuted on November 17, 2012. The series is presented by Brian Russell, an attorney as well as a forensic and clinical psychologist, and Stacy Kaiser, a licensed psychotherapist and relationship expert. Each episode tells the stories of marriages that turned deadly. On March 1, 2018, it was announced that the series has been renewed for a sixth season. In February 2020, after a two-year hiatus, the series returned for a seventh and final season. In April 2020, it was announced that the series would not be renewed.

Episodes

Season 1 (2012-2013)

Season 2 (2013-2014)

Season 3 (2014-2015)

Season 4 (2015-2016)

Season 5 (2017)

Season 6 (2018)

Season 7 (2020)

References

External links

2010s American documentary television series
2012 American television series debuts
Investigation Discovery original programming
2020 American television series endings